Anna & Katy is a British comedy sketch show, beginning on Channel 4 on 6 March 2013 following a pilot edition as part of the Comedy Lab series in 2011. It featured regular comedy partners Anna Crilly and Katy Wix, with regular guests including Lee Mack, whose sitcom Not Going Out Wix also starred in at the time.

Regular sketches
Congratulation! - A spoof television show in which two cheerful presenters read out congratulatory messages to viewers for mundane events, including buying a new jacket or receiving a new passport. Although the presenters (played by Crilly and Wix) are both white, they, and any guests on the show, speak in broad Jamaican accents. The show ends with one viewer receiving "the biggest congratulation of them all", which involves the presenters flashing their vaginas (censored with a "Congratulation" graphic). Congratulation!
Hard to explain - Two odd-looking women with broad Birmingham accents explain something from popular culture as if it were unknown (e.g. IKEA, which they describe as "always all yellow", "done up in all these rooms... but you're not allowed to sleep in them" and somewhere couples can go to argue). They always begin with the phrase "it's quite hard to explain if you've never seen it" and end by making an apparently unwitting sexual innuendo ("and then we just go out cock-hunting; you know, hunting for cockerels").
The Lane - A soap opera sponsored by Ultra Vision Lenses in which, in a satire of product placement, all the characters wear glasses and most of the storylines relate to vision problems.
Rice Britannia* - A spoof of cookery competition shows such as MasterChef and The Great British Bake Off in which contestants compete for the chance to cook rice "atop the home of rice, the Great Wall of China".
Ignition- A spoof of The Apprentice. A car wash company discuss ways to improve business, which often uses well-known stereotypical quotes from The Apprentice such as: "I'd like to stop you there" and "As project manager...".
Various spoof German TV shows, in which the dialogue is a pidgin German-English hybrid peppered with innuendo. Examples include a smutty German version of Countdown and an all-sausage version of Antiques Roadshow.
The World's Most...''', which pokes fun at the typical end-of-year review programmes and the Z-list celebrities featured on them.

Reception
Emma Gosnell of The Daily Telegraph described the show as "a lot of fun" and described Wix and Crilly as "undoubtedly brilliant mimics", but added "However, some skits were simply absurd". Julie Raeside of The Guardian'' dismissed comparisons between the duo and French and Saunders, suggesting that "If Anna and Katy have to be "the new" anything... it really should be Reeves and Mortimer".

References

External links

2010s British television sketch shows
2011 British television series debuts
2013 British television series endings
Channel 4 comedy
English-language television shows